The 2002 NASCAR Winston Cup Series was the 54th season of professional stock car racing in the United States and the 31st modern-era Cup Series season. It began on February 10, 2002, at Daytona International Speedway, and ended on November 17, 2002, at Homestead-Miami Speedway. Tony Stewart, driving for Joe Gibbs Racing, was declared as the Winston Cup champion. Bill Elliott won the 2002 NASCAR's Most Popular Driver Award. He would win it for the 16th and final time in his career. He withdrew from the ballot after receiving the award. The NASCAR Manufacturers' Championship was captured by Ford after winning 14 events and gaining 245 points over second-place finisher Chevrolet, who had 10 wins and 211 points.

This was the final season for the non-common template bodies. The following season would require all manufacturers to use the same roofline. The most significant rule change for 2002 was the implementation of the one-engine rule for race weekends. At a race event, cars would now be required to practice, qualify, and race with the same engine. The rule banned separate "qualifying engines" (and "practice engines"). Unapproved engine changes during the weekend would be met with a grid penalty. Before the start of the race, cars that changed engines would be forced to move to the rear of the field before the green flag. The rule was an effort to reduce costs, and potentially save crews valuable time during the course of a race weekend.

Teams and drivers

Complete schedule

Limited schedule

Schedule

Races

Budweiser Shootout 
The exhibition Budweiser Shootout race, for drivers that won a pole position in the previous season or previously won the event, was held on February 10 at Daytona International Speedway.

Top ten results

20- Tony Stewart
8- Dale Earnhardt Jr.
24- Jeff Gordon
36- Ken Schrader
40- Sterling Marlin
88- Dale Jarrett
5- Terry Labonte
18- Bobby Labonte
1- Kenny Wallace
66- Todd Bodine

Gatorade Twin 125s 
The Gatorade 125s qualifying for the Daytona 500 were held on February 14 at Daytona International Speedway.

Race one: Top ten results

24- Jeff Gordon
8- Dale Earnhardt Jr.
36- Ken Schrader
21- Ricky Rudd
5- Terry Labonte
40- Sterling Marlin
97- Kurt Busch
33- Mike Wallace
22- Ward Burton
88- Dale Jarrett

Race two: Top ten results

15- Michael Waltrip
20- Tony Stewart
25- Jerry Nadeau
29- Kevin Harvick
18- Bobby Labonte
31- Robby Gordon
71- Dave Marcis
43- John Andretti
1- Kenny Wallace
4- Mike Skinner

Daytona 500 

The 2002 Daytona 500 was held on Sunday, February 17. Rookie Jimmie Johnson won the pole, while Ward Burton won the race. This was the first Daytona 500 after the death of Dale Earnhardt.

Top ten results
22- Ward Burton
21- Elliott Sadler
09- Geoff Bodine
97- Kurt Busch
15- Michael Waltrip
6- Mark Martin
12- Ryan Newman
40- Sterling Marlin
24- Jeff Gordon
10- Johnny Benson
Failed to qualify: #41-Jimmy Spencer, #23-Hut Stricklin, #44-Buckshot Jones, #16-Greg Biffle, #90-Rick Mast, #59-Bobby Gerhart, #02-Hermie Sadler, #85-Carl Long, #84-Norm Benning, #80-Kirk Shelmerdine

This race had a bizarre ending. As the field took the restart with 5 laps to go, a multi-car accident involving 5 cars took place at the start/finish line when a driver missed a gear, bringing out the caution flag once again. Headed down the front straightaway going into turn 1, Sterling Marlin went to the inside of Jeff Gordon battling for the lead and when they made contact, Gordon's car was sent spinning. This incident pushed the fender of Marlin's car into his tire. Sterling Marlin would beat Ward Burton back to the caution flag for the lead. As the red flag was thrown to give crews time to clean up the race track to try and ensure a green flag finish, NASCAR reviewed Marlin's move as it appeared he had gone below the yellow line on the inside to pass Jeff Gordon, which is now illegal on NASCAR restrictor-plate tracks.  While under the red flag, Marlin got out of his race car and started pulling on his fender, in violation of NASCAR's rule of working on the car under the red flag. This penalty sent Marlin back to the end of the line for the restart, giving Ward Burton the race lead for when they went back to the green flag.
Ward Burton won this race in a Dodge, the first 500 win for the manufacturer since Richard Petty won in 1974.
On lap 148, Kevin Harvick and Jeff Gordon made contact battling for position in turn 1, triggering an 18-car accident.
Even though he replaced Dale Earnhardt after his death and went on to win Rookie of the Year in 2001, this was Kevin Harvick's 1st career Daytona 500 start.
As of 2020, this is the only Daytona 500 in NASCAR History that 2 sets of 3 brothers all raced against each other: The Wallace's (Rusty, Mike, & Kenny), and The Bodine's (Geoff, Brett, & Todd). The eldest brother of each set (Rusty and Geoff), finished ahead of the younger brothers. The Wallace's finished 18th (Rusty), 21st (Mike), & 30th (Kenny). The Bodine's finished 3rd (Geoff), 16th (Brett), & 31st (Todd). All 6 drivers saw the checkered flag and finished the race. However, Geoff was the only one to finish on the lead lap.
This race would mark the final career start of longtime driver Dave Marcis. Marcis' run was shortened 79 laps into the race due to engine problems. This was also Marcis' 33rd and final Daytona 500 start. As of 2020, Marcis' 33 starts in the Daytona 500 is the most in NASCAR history. Richard Petty and Terry Labonte are tied for 2nd all-time with 32 Daytona 500 starts.
First career pole for Jimmie Johnson.
Final career Top 5 for Geoff Bodine.

Subway 400 

The Subway 400 was held on February 24 at North Carolina Speedway. Ricky Craven won the pole.

17- Matt Kenseth
40- Sterling Marlin
18- Bobby Labonte
20- Tony Stewart
32- Ricky Craven
99- Jeff Burton
24- Jeff Gordon
2- Rusty Wallace
55- Bobby Hamilton
1- Kenny Wallace

Failed to qualify: Dick Trickle (No. 71), Randy Renfrow (No. 59), Carl Long (No. 85)

With about five laps to go, the caution was brought out for debris.  Multiple teams were hoping the race would go back green, but NASCAR decided to end the race under caution, giving Matt Kenseth the victory.
Sterling Marlin would take over the points lead, and he would hold the top spot for 25 consecutive weeks. He would lose the lead at Loudon in mid-September. As of 2020, his streak of 25 straight weeks would be the longest in history for a driver to not win a NASCAR championship.

UAW-Daimler Chrysler 400 

The UAW-DaimlerChrysler 400 was held on March 3 at Las Vegas Motor Speedway. Todd Bodine won the pole in an unsponsored Travis Carter Motorsports entry; the No. 66 got a one-race deal with CSK Auto after qualifying.

Top ten results

40- Sterling Marlin
19- Jeremy Mayfield
6- Mark Martin
12- Ryan Newman
20- Tony Stewart
48- Jimmie Johnson
88- Dale Jarrett
9- Bill Elliott
99- Jeff Burton
41- Jimmy Spencer

Failed to qualify: Derrike Cope (No. 57)

 First career Top 10 finish for Jimmie Johnson.

MBNA America 500 
The MBNA America 500 was held on March 10 at Atlanta Motor Speedway. Bill Elliott won the pole.

Top ten results

20- Tony Stewart
8- Dale Earnhardt Jr.
48- Jimmie Johnson
17- Matt Kenseth
32- Ricky Craven
2- Rusty Wallace
22- Ward Burton
6- Mark Martin
40- Sterling Marlin
12- Ryan Newman

Failed to qualify: Ron Hornaday Jr. (No. 57), Carl Long (No. 85)

This would be Tony Stewart's first career 500 mile NASCAR win.
An incident in the previous race with a spin by Sterling Marlin led to a new rule change.  After 11 years, NASCAR changed pit road speeding penalties;  if a driver was caught speeding on the approach to the pit stall, the penalty was no longer 15 seconds; rather, the penalty was a pit pass-through, which also became the penalty for speeding on the pit exit, instead of a stop-and-go.  The stop-and-go was used only for repeat violations.
First career Top 5 finish for Jimmie Johnson.

Carolina Dodge Dealers 400 
The Carolina Dodge Dealers 400 was held on March 17 at Darlington Raceway. Ricky Craven won the pole.

Top ten results

40- Sterling Marlin
21- Elliott Sadler
29- Kevin Harvick
8- Dale Earnhardt Jr.
12- Ryan Newman
48- Jimmie Johnson
2- Rusty Wallace
17- Matt Kenseth
24- Jeff Gordon
9- Bill Elliott

Failed to qualify: none

Marlin had to start at the back after changing an engine in a happy hour. By the halfway point he was already in third place.
Tony Stewart was shaken up after a grinding 11-car crash late in the race.
This race also marked the return of Steve Park after his injuries suffered in a NASCAR Busch Series event at Darlington in September 2001. Park crashed early.
This was Marlin's last career Cup Series victory.

Food City 500 

The Food City 500 was held on March 24 at Bristol Motor Speedway. Jeff Gordon won the pole.

Top ten results
97- Kurt Busch
41- Jimmy Spencer
28- Ricky Rudd
8- Dale Earnhardt Jr.
18- Bobby Labonte
17- Matt Kenseth
48- Jimmie Johnson
25- Jerry Nadeau
2- Rusty Wallace
29- Kevin Harvick

Failed to qualify: none

Tony Stewart started the race 13th and led 74 laps, but was replaced by Todd Bodine during a caution due to some pain sustained from the wreck in the Darlington Race the previous week. Todd was able to finish the race in 15th.
It was during the week preceding this race that NASCAR announced it would no longer charge provisionals to teams that did not qualify in the top 36, in events in which 43 or fewer teams attempted to qualify.
This was Busch's first career victory and was the continuation (Spencer wrecked Busch in the 2001 Phoenix race) of what would later become a very heated rivalry between him and Spencer.
Kurt Busch became the 5th driver in NASCAR to score his 1st career Winston Cup win at Bristol, joining Dale Earnhardt, Rusty Wallace, Ernie Irvan, and Elliott Sadler.
After the race, a heated incident occurred on pit road with Robby Gordon and Dale Earnhardt Jr. from an incident earlier in the race when Earnhardt Jr. and Gordon, who was a lap down at the time, got together. At the end of the cool-down lap, Earnhardt Jr. ran into the side of Gordon's car entering pit road before Gordon retaliated by running into the back of him and turning him around in the middle of the pits.

Samsung/Radio Shack 500 

The Samsung/Radio Shack 500 was held at Texas Motor Speedway on April 8. Bill Elliott won the pole. The race was postponed from Sunday to Monday due to rain.

Top ten results

17- Matt Kenseth
24- Jeff Gordon
6- Mark Martin
28- Ricky Rudd
20- Tony Stewart
48- Jimmie Johnson
40- Sterling Marlin
41- Jimmy Spencer
9- Bill Elliott
5- Terry Labonte

Failed to qualify: Ron Hornaday Jr. (No. 57)

Virginia 500 
The Virginia 500 was held at Martinsville Speedway on April 14, 2002. Jeff Gordon won the pole.

Top ten results

18- Bobby Labonte
17- Matt Kenseth
88- Dale Jarrett
20- Tony Stewart
8- Dale Earnhardt Jr.
5- Terry Labonte
28- Ricky Rudd
6- Mark Martin
99- Jeff Burton
97- Kurt Busch

Kevin Harvick was banned from competing in the race due to reckless driving in the Advance Auto Parts 250 Truck Series race the day before when he intentionally wrecked driver Coy Gibbs. Kenny Wallace drove the No. 29 in his place.
As of 2022, this is the last race without Kevin Harvick.
This was Bobby Labonte's 1st and only short track win.

Failed to qualify: Randy Renfrow (No. 59)

Aaron's 499 

The Aaron's 499 was held at Talladega Superspeedway on April 21, 2002. Jimmie Johnson won the pole.

Top ten results

8- Dale Earnhardt Jr.
15- Michael Waltrip
97- Kurt Busch
24- Jeff Gordon
40- Sterling Marlin
88- Dale Jarrett
48- Jimmie Johnson
2- Rusty Wallace
99- Jeff Burton
45- Kyle Petty

The "Big One" took out at least 24 cars on lap 164 when Kyle Petty got out of the draft and sent Tony Stewart in the wall and then mayhem erupted. Ironically, it was in the exact same spot where a 30 car pileup happened in the Busch Series race 24 hours earlier.

Failed to qualify: Shawna Robinson (No. 49), Rick Mast (No. 90), Bobby Gerhart (No. 59), Dick Trickle (No. 91)

NAPA Auto Parts 500 

The NAPA Auto Parts 500 was held at California Speedway on April 28, 2002. Ryan Newman won the pole.

Top ten results

48- Jimmie Johnson*
97- Kurt Busch
28- Ricky Rudd
9- Bill Elliott
6- Mark Martin
88- Dale Jarrett
40- Sterling Marlin
2- Rusty Wallace
77- Dave Blaney
15- Michael Waltrip

Dale Earnhardt Jr. was involved in a hard crash when Kevin Harvick cut down a tire and hit Earnhardt's car, sending him head-on into the outside wall. He suffered a severe concussion, but kept the injury a secret for several months and did not miss any races.
The win was Jimmie Johnson's first career Winston Cup victory.
Greg Biffle made his first NASCAR Winston Cup race, qualifying in an entry for Roush Racing. Greg finished in 13th

Failed to qualify: Brendan Gaughan (No. 62), Chad Little (No. 74), Hermie Sadler (No. 02)

Pontiac Excitement 400 

The Pontiac Excitement 400 was scheduled to be run at Richmond International Raceway on Saturday night, but rain ended up stopping the race after 66 laps; the remainder was run on Sunday, May 5, during the daytime. Ward Burton won the pole.

Top ten results

20- Tony Stewart
12- Ryan Newman
99- Jeff Burton
6- Mark Martin
19- Jeremy Mayfield
17- Matt Kenseth
24- Jeff Gordon
44- Steve Grissom
32- Ricky Craven
41- Jimmy Spencer

Failed to qualify: Kevin Grubb (No. 54)

 Johnny Benson was injured in an accident in the Busch Series race the night before and was replaced by Joe Nemechek and subsequently Jerry Nadeau.
 This race marked the final career start for Rick Mast.
 Last career Top 10 finish for Steve Grissom.
Last career pole for Ward Burton.
 Following the death of TLC band member Lisa "Left Eye" Lopes in a car accident, autopsy photos of the accident were leaked to the media. As a similar controversy had taken place following autopsy photos following Dale Earnhardt's death, the Dale Earnhardt, Inc. drivers (Dale Earnhardt Jr.; Michael Waltrip and Steve Park) painted a single black stripe next to the left headlight decal of their cars as both a tribute to Lopes and an act of protest of the leaked photos.

The Winston 

Ryan Newman held off Dale Earnhardt Jr. to win The Winston. He also won the No Bull 5 Sprint earlier that day.

Coca-Cola Racing Family 600 

The Coca-Cola Racing Family 600 was held at Lowe's Motor Speedway on May 26, 2002. Jimmie Johnson won the pole.

Top ten results

6- Mark Martin
17- Matt Kenseth
32- Ricky Craven
28- Ricky Rudd
24- Jeff Gordon
20- Tony Stewart
48- Jimmie Johnson
15- Michael Waltrip
9- Bill Elliott
2- Rusty Wallace

Failed to qualify: Chad Little (No. 74), Carl Long (No. 85), Derrike Cope (No. 37), Randy Renfrow (No. 59)

 This was Mark Martin's first win in 73 races since Martinsville back in April 2000. Not only did Martin snap his winless drought, but he also won his first and only Winston No Bull 5 Million Dollar Bonus in his 9th attempt. He became eligible for this race after finishing in the Top 5 at Las Vegas two months prior. He is also the first and only driver not named Jeff or Dale to win the bonus.
This would be Roush Racing 4th consecutive win in the Coca-Cola 600, thus becoming the only team in NASCAR history to accomplish this feat.
In this race, Ricky Rudd would become NASCAR's new Iron Man by making his 656th consecutive start, passing Terry Labonte. Labonte held the Iron Man record with 655 consecutive starts, and his streak ended when he had to miss the 2000 Brickyard 400 due to injury. Rudd would finish his Iron Man streak at the end of 2005 with 788 consecutive starts, and he would hold that record for exactly 10 years. In late 2015 at Loudon, Jeff Gordon would pass Rudd by making his 789th consecutive start. As of 2022, Jeff Gordon is currently NASCAR's Iron Man with 797 consecutive starts.

MBNA Platinum 400 
The MBNA Platinum 400 was held at Dover International Speedway on June 2. Matt Kenseth won the pole position.

Top ten results

48- Jimmie Johnson
9- Bill Elliott
99- Jeff Burton
12- Ryan Newman
88- Dale Jarrett
24- Jeff Gordon
32- Ricky Craven
31- Robby Gordon
55- Bobby Hamilton
21- Elliott Sadler

Failed to qualify: Derrike Cope (No. 37), Hermie Sadler (No. 90), Randy Renfrow (No. 59)

Pocono 500 
The Pocono 500 was held at Pocono Raceway on June 9. Qualifying was rained out, so points leader Sterling Marlin started on the pole.

Top ten results

88- Dale Jarrett
6- Mark Martin
48- Jimmie Johnson
40- Sterling Marlin
24- Jeff Gordon
99- Jeff Burton
20- Tony Stewart
15- Michael Waltrip
2- Rusty Wallace
77- Dave Blaney

Failed to qualify: none

 This race ended under caution as Ricky Rudd crashed, bringing out the yellow flag before the leaders took the white flag.

Sirius 400 
The Sirius 400 was held at Michigan International Speedway on June 16. Dale Jarrett won the pole.

Top ten results

17- Matt Kenseth
88- Dale Jarrett
12- Ryan Newman
15- Michael Waltrip
24- Jeff Gordon
10- Johnny Benson
2- Rusty Wallace
28- Ricky Rudd
6- Mark Martin
97- Kurt Busch

Failed to qualify: none

Dodge/Save Mart 350 
The Dodge/Save Mart 350 was held at Infineon Raceway on June 23. Tony Stewart won the pole.

Top ten results

28- Ricky Rudd
20- Tony Stewart
5- Terry Labonte
97- Kurt Busch
30- Jeff Green
21- Elliott Sadler
6- Mark Martin
9- Bill Elliott
12- Ryan Newman
43- John Andretti

Failed to qualify: Brandon Ash (No. 46), Stacy Compton (No. 14)
 Jerry Nadeau nearly won the race when his rear-end gear failed, causing him to stop his No. 44 car with less than 3 laps to go. The lead changed to Ricky Rudd, who held on to win.
This was Ricky Rudd's first win at Sonoma since winning the inaugural race in 1989. He almost won the 1991 race but was black-flagged when he spun Davey Allison during the final lap to take the lead.
This would be Rudd's 6th career road course win, putting him in a 2 way tie for 4th all-time with Rusty Wallace. As of 2022 those 2 drivers are tied for 4th all-time with 6 victories  Chase Elliott is in 3rd with 7 victories, Tony Stewart is in 2nd with 8 victories, and Jeff Gordon is the all-time winner with 9 victories.
This was Rudd's last career Cup series victory.
Final victory for the legendary #28 Texaco/Havoline Yates Racing Ford. Also the last time a car #28 has won in NASCAR Cup Series Competition.

Pepsi 400 
The Pepsi 400 was held at Daytona International Speedway on July 6. Kevin Harvick won the pole.

Top ten results
15- Michael Waltrip
2- Rusty Wallace
40- Sterling Marlin
41- Jimmy Spencer
6- Mark Martin
8- Dale Earnhardt Jr.
26- Todd Bodine
48- Jimmie Johnson
22- Ward Burton
09- Geoff Bodine

Failed to qualify: Ed Berrier (No. 90), Steve Grissom (No. 44)

 2nd career win for Michael Waltrip. With this race, Michael Waltrip won the 2nd straight race at Daytona on FOX with the support of broadcast analyst/older brother Darrell.
 The Big One occurred with 25 laps remaining when Dale Jarrett got down low and spun back up into traffic, blocking the entire track and collecting 13 other cars. Joe Nemechek went head-on into the wall and Brett Bodine caught fire.
 This was DEI's second Pepsi 400 win in a row. 
 This race ended under the caution flag.
 This was Kevin Harvick's first career pole position for a Cup Series race.
 Final career Top 10 for Geoff Bodine.

Tropicana 400 
The Tropicana 400 was held at Chicagoland Speedway on July 14, 2002. Ryan Newman won the pole.

Top ten results
29- Kevin Harvick
24- Jeff Gordon
20- Tony Stewart
48- Jimmie Johnson
12- Ryan Newman
97- Kurt Busch
9- Bill Elliott
31- Robby Gordon
6- Mark Martin
8- Dale Earnhardt Jr.

Failed to qualify: Ron Hornaday Jr. (No. 49), Kirk Shelmerdine (No. 72), Tony Raines (No. 74), Scott Wimmer (No. 27)
One lap after the restart with 70 laps to go, Kevin Harvick steered the car to the apron and made a good pass but he lost it when passing on the apron and spun out into the grass in turn 1 that caused three other cars to lose control and spin out including Jerry Nadeau, Elliott Sadler, and Jimmy Spencer. He took the lead just 46 laps later and had enough gas to win the race for the second straight year and end a 35-race winless streak.

New England 300 
The New England 300 was held at New Hampshire International Speedway on July 21. Bill Elliott won the pole.

Top ten results

22- Ward Burton*
30- Jeff Green
88- Dale Jarrett
2- Rusty Wallace
12- Ryan Newman
26- Todd Bodine
31- Robby Gordon
97- Kurt Busch
29- Kevin Harvick
21- Elliott Sadler

This was Ward Burton's final Cup victory. 
With this win and the Daytona 500 win, 2002 was the only season in Ward Burton's career that he won multiple races in a season.
Matt Kenseth dominated the last part of the race, as well as leading the most laps (77), but ended up with a flat tire while leading with 10 laps to go, and unfortunately finished 33rd, the last car one lap down.
Brett Bodine led 1 lap. It was the last lap Bodine led in his Cup Series career.

Failed to qualify: none

Pennsylvania 500 
The Pennsylvania 500 was held at Pocono Raceway on July 28. Bill Elliott swept both qualifying and the race. The race was shortened to 175 laps due to darkness, because of two lengthy red flags – one for rain and one for fence repairs after Steve Park (who barrel-rolled multiple times) and Dale Earnhardt Jr. wrecked on the first lap.

Top ten results

9- Bill Elliott
97- Kurt Busch
40- Sterling Marlin
88- Dale Jarrett
12- Ryan Newman
29- Kevin Harvick
20- Tony Stewart
17- Matt Kenseth
5- Terry Labonte
28- Ricky Rudd

Failed to qualify: Carl Long (No. 79)

55th and last career pole for Bill Elliott. Final time in his career as well that Bill Elliott won a race from the pole.
With this win, Bill Elliott, at the time, became the first 5-time winner at Pocono Raceway. He would be the only driver to do so until Jeff Gordon accomplished that feat in 2011. Gordon however, would break out of the tie with Elliott one year later when he won a rain shortened race in August 2012, making him the only 6-time winner at Pocono. Until 2020 when Denny Hamlin won the 2nd Pocono race and became the second 6-time winner at the track.

Brickyard 400 

The Brickyard 400 was held at Indianapolis Motor Speedway on August 4. Tony Stewart won the pole. This was the first race to feature Steel and Foam Energy Reduction (SAFER) barrier at Indianapolis that was used to make racing accidents safer.

Top ten results

9- Bill Elliott
2- Rusty Wallace
17- Matt Kenseth
12- Ryan Newman
29- Kevin Harvick
24- Jeff Gordon
1- Steve Park
31- Robby Gordon
48- Jimmie Johnson
88- Dale Jarrett

Failed to qualify: Ron Hornaday Jr. (No. 49), Derrike Cope (No. 37), Scott Wimmer (No. 27), Tony Raines (No. 74), Jim Sauter (No. 71), Stuart Kirby (No. 57), P. J. Jones (No. 50)
The SAFER barrier was first tested by Brett Bodine on lap 11 and Kurt Busch, in which Jimmy Spencer spun out Busch on lap 36 in turn 3.
Tony Stewart is the only driver to start at the pole in both the Indianapolis 500 and the Brickyard 400.
First time since 1992 that Bill Elliott won back-to-back races. This would also be the first time in 2002 that a driver would win back-to-back races. Final time in his career as well that Bill Elliott would win back-to-back races.

Sirius Satellite Radio at The Glen 

The Sirius Satellite Radio at The Glen was held at Watkins Glen International on August 11. Ricky Rudd won the pole.

Top ten results

20- Tony Stewart
12- Ryan Newman
31- Robby Gordon
14- P. J. Jones*
28- Ricky Rudd
41- Scott Pruett*
99- Jeff Burton
26- Todd Bodine
15- Michael Waltrip
6- Mark Martin

Failed to qualify: Austin Cameron (No. 62), Shane Lewis (No. 09), Justin Bell (No. 46), Jimmy Spencer (No. 42)

P. J. Jones' first ever top five.
Tony Stewart led the most laps with 34. Robby Gordon controlled the race early leading for 21 laps. On the final restart, Tony Stewart appeared to have restarted too early and despite this won the race. A cloud of controversy over the restart tainted the finish of the race. Ryan Newman's team owner Roger Penske protested, but Stewart's win was upheld by officials days later.
 Scott Pruett picked up his career-best finish at that point in time, substituting for Jimmy Spencer, who DNQ'd in a third Chip Ganassi entry.

Pepsi 400 presented by Farmer Jack 

The Pepsi 400 presented by Farmer Jack was held at Michigan International Speedway on August 18. Dale Earnhardt Jr. won the pole.

Top ten results

88- Dale Jarrett
20- Tony Stewart
29- Kevin Harvick
99- Jeff Burton
6- Mark Martin
40- Sterling Marlin
48- Jimmie Johnson
10- Johnny Benson
30- Jeff Green
8- Dale Earnhardt Jr.

Failed to qualify: Greg Biffle (No. 16)

Final time in his career that Dale Jarrett won multiple races in a season.
This was the last race Melling Racing competed in, finishing 26th with Stacy Compton who actually led 3 laps on a pit cycle.

Sharpie 500 

The Sharpie 500 was held at Bristol Motor Speedway on August 24. Jeff Gordon won the pole.

Top ten results

24- Jeff Gordon
2- Rusty Wallace
8- Dale Earnhardt Jr.
29- Kevin Harvick
17- Matt Kenseth
97- Kurt Busch
40- Sterling Marlin
41- Jimmy Spencer
18- Bobby Labonte
14- Mike Wallace

Failed to qualify: Hermie Sadler (No. 02), Carl Long (No. 51), Morgan Shepherd (No. 89), Tim Sauter (No. 71)

This race is remembered for Jeff Gordon using the "Bump and Run" to get underneath and past Rusty Wallace to end a winless drought that dated back to the end of 2001.
The race was also marred with on-track confrontations, including Ward Burton who threw heel pads at Dale Earnhardt Jr. after Earnhardt Jr. wrecked him on lap 405, which caused Burton to be summoned to the Big Red Truck. Robby Gordon was also penalized for two laps after spinning out Jimmie Johnson on a restart.

Mountain Dew Southern 500 

The Mountain Dew Southern 500 was held at Darlington Raceway on September 1. Qualifying was rained out, so points leader Sterling Marlin started on the pole.

Top ten results

24- Jeff Gordon
12- Ryan Newman
9- Bill Elliott
40- Sterling Marlin
88- Dale Jarrett
22- Ward Burton
97- Kurt Busch
20- Tony Stewart
48- Jimmie Johnson
99- Jeff Burton

Failed to qualify: Carl Long (No. 51)

With this win, Jeff Gordon would tie Cale Yarborough as a 5-time winner of the Southern 500, the most of all drivers.
Jeff Gordon would become the 7th driver in NASCAR history to win 60+ NASCAR races.
After the 31 race winless streak that dates back to Kansas in September 2001, Jeff Gordon won the previous weekend at Bristol, and he would back it up in this race, sending a message to all the critics that he is back and on the hunt for yet another championship. This would be the 17th time in his career as well that he has pulled off back-to-back victories.
Jeff Gordon became the 2nd driver of 2002 to win back-to-back races, joining Bill Elliott.

Chevrolet Monte Carlo 400 
The Chevrolet Monte Carlo 400 was held at Richmond International Raceway on September 7. Jimmie Johnson won the pole.

Top ten results

17- Matt Kenseth
12- Ryan Newman
30- Jeff Green
8- Dale Earnhardt Jr.
26- Todd Bodine
6- Mark Martin
28- Ricky Rudd
22- Ward Burton 1 lap down
77- Dave Blaney 1 lap down
19- Jeremy Mayfield 1 lap down

Failed to qualify: Carl Long (No. 51)

 The race was billed as the Looney Tunes Rematch, as 8 Chevrolet drivers drove special paint schemes of the Looney Tunes characters. The drivers were Jeff Green/Daffy Duck, Bobby Hamilton/Marvin the Martian, Jimmie Johnson/Sylvester the Cat and Tweety Bird, Mike Skinner/Yosemite Sam, Joe Nemechek/Speedy Gonzales, Terry Labonte/Wile E. Coyote and The Roadrunner, Kevin Harvick/Tasmanian Devil, and Robby Gordon/Pepe Le Pew. Jeff Gordon planned to run a Bugs Bunny paint scheme but he crashed the car in practice, leaving Gordon to bring out his back-up car.
 To the rear, No. 24 Jeff Gordon (back-up car)
 Greg Biffle drove in place of Bobby Hamilton who suffered injuries in the Craftsman Truck Series race held the Thursday before.
 There was a charity golf cart race sponsored by Students Against Violence which teamed the drivers with their respective Looney Tunes character, Jeff Green won the race paired with Daffy Duck. Jeff Gordon fell out of his golf cart and suffered a bruised hand but still participated in the race.
During the pre-race, the pace car blew an engine and laid oil down turns 3 and 4. On the first few laps, several drivers went sliding and Jeff Burton, Jimmy Spencer, and Sterling Marlin, the points leader and competing in the No Bull wrecked on lap 7. Marlin would suffer several injuries from that wreck but raced until Kansas when a more serious injury occurred.
As of 2020, this was the 30th and final race in NASCAR History that 2 sets of 3 brothers (Wallace's: Rusty, Mike, and Kenny & Bodine's: Geoff, Brett, and Todd), all competed against each other, with those 6 drivers being featured in all 30 races. The Wallace's finished 12th (Mike), 14th (Kenny) & 15th (Rusty). The Bodine's finished 5th (Todd), 20th (Brett), & 38th (Geoff). All drivers but Geoff saw the checkered flag and finished the race. Todd would be the only one to finish on the lead lap.

New Hampshire 300 
The New Hampshire 300 was held at New Hampshire International Speedway on September 15. Ryan Newman won the pole. The race was shortened to 207 laps due to rain.

Top ten results

12- Ryan Newman
97- Kurt Busch
20- Tony Stewart
10- Johnny Benson
18- Bobby Labonte
32- Ricky Craven
88- Dale Jarrett
15- Michael Waltrip
48- Jimmie Johnson
17- Matt Kenseth

Failed to qualify: Carl Long (No. 51)

This was Ryan Newman's first career Cup Series points victory
Oddly enough, Newman was the second driver to first win the All-Star race before getting their first points race victory (Michael Waltrip was the first).
Sterling Marlin would lose the points lead for the first time after leading the standings for 25 consecutive weeks. As of 2020, his streak of 25 straight weeks would be the longest in history for a driver to not win a NASCAR championship.

MBNA All-American Heroes 400 

The MBNA All-American Heroes 400 was held at Dover International Speedway on September 22. Rusty Wallace won the pole.

Top ten results

48- Jimmie Johnson
6- Mark Martin
88- Dale Jarrett
17- Matt Kenseth
20- Tony Stewart
99- Jeff Burton
97- Kurt Busch
12- Ryan Newman
32- Ricky Craven 1 lap down
10- Johnny Benson 1 lap down

Failed to qualify: Scott Wimmer (No. 27), Brett Bodine (No. 11), Morgan Shepherd (No. 51)

Hideo Fukuyama made his Cup series debut in this race, becoming the first Japanese driver to start a NASCAR points race.
Jimmie Johnson swept both Dover races.
Johnson with this win also ties Tony Stewart's record for most wins in a season as a rookie in the Cup series.
36th and final career pole for Rusty Wallace.

Protection One 400 

The Protection One 400 was held at Kansas Speedway on September 29. Dale Earnhardt Jr. won the pole.

Top ten results

24- Jeff Gordon
12- Ryan Newman
2- Rusty Wallace
25- Joe Nemechek
9- Bill Elliott
8- Dale Earnhardt Jr.
17- Matt Kenseth
20- Tony Stewart
19- Jeremy Mayfield
48- Jimmie Johnson 1 lap down

Due to a neck injury suffered in a crash, Sterling Marlin did not race again for the rest of the season.
Jimmie Johnson took the points lead, the first time that a Rookie driver has led the points standings in NASCAR history.
This is the last race without Jamie McMurray on the grid until Atlanta 2019.

Failed to qualify: Brett Bodine (No. 11), Kirk Shelmerdine (No. 27), Carl Long (No. 51)

EA Sports 500 

The EA Sports 500 was held at Talladega Superspeedway on October 6. Qualifying was rained out, so points leader Jimmie Johnson started on the pole. The race was caution-free for the third time in five years at Talladega.

Top ten results

8- Dale Earnhardt Jr.
20- Tony Stewart
28- Ricky Rudd
97- Kurt Busch
30- Jeff Green
1- Steve Park
12- Ryan Newman
15- Michael Waltrip
88- Dale Jarrett
22- Ward Burton

Failed to qualify: Morgan Shepherd (No. 51), Geoff Bodine (No. 09), Robert Pressley (No. 92), Kerry Earnhardt (No. 83)

Season sweep and 3rd straight Talladega win for Dale Earnhardt Jr. With this win, he joins Buddy Baker as the only 2 drivers in NASCAR history to win 3 straight Talladega races.
In a bizarre event, during the pace laps, Mark Martin had a steering problem and crashed into Jimmie Johnson. Martin was black-flagged prior to the race start so NASCAR could verify his steering was working properly, while Johnson did not pit until the conclusion of the first green flag lap. Due to the caution free race, neither driver was able to recover from the incident.
Jamie McMurray began driving duties for Sterling Marlin in this race. This was his first career start. He finished in 26th
All Hendrick Motorsports engines failed during the race (Jeff Gordon, Joe Nemechek, Jimmie Johnson, Terry Labonte, as well as the Hendrick affiliated cars of Johnny Benson and Ken Schrader)
As of 2018, this would be the last time ever that a NASCAR race would go flag to flag green (or caution free). In 2017, NASCAR would make a 3 stages format for every race of the season, and at a certain lap at the end of each stage, they would throw the caution flag, thus making it that a race can no longer go flag to flag green (or caution free).
Last Winston No. 5 race.

UAW-GM Quality 500 

The UAW-GM Quality 500 was held at Lowe's Motor Speedway on October 13. Qualifying was rained out, so points leader Tony Stewart started on the pole.

Top ten results

40- Jamie McMurray*
18- Bobby Labonte
20- Tony Stewart
24- Jeff Gordon
2- Rusty Wallace
48- Jimmie Johnson
99- Jeff Burton
12- Ryan Newman
8- Dale Earnhardt Jr.
77- Dave Blaney

Failed to qualify: Carl Long (No. 59), Kirk Shelmerdine (No. 72), Scott Wimmer (No. 27), Jack Sprague (No. 60), Kerry Earnhardt (No. 83), Ron Hornaday Jr. (No. 54)

 Rain caused the start of the race to be delayed over 3 hours. After the rain stopped, NASCAR decided to start the race under yellow for the first 5 laps as the track continued to dry.
 The race went green at 3:45 pm Charlotte time (Eastern). Sunset time was 6:51 pm, the race was completed at 7:17, The late finish contributed to a large jump in ratings for the NBC telecast. NASCAR decided to move the fall race at Charlotte from Sunday afternoon to Saturday night for 2003.
 Jamie McMurray, subbing for an injured Sterling Marlin, won his first race in his second career start, setting a new modern era NASCAR record for the quickest win.

Old Dominion 500 

The Old Dominion 500 was held at Martinsville Speedway on October 20. Ryan Newman won the pole.

Top ten results

97- Kurt Busch
10- Johnny Benson
28- Ricky Rudd
8- Dale Earnhardt Jr.
22- Ward Burton
48- Jimmie Johnson
32- Ricky Craven
88- Dale Jarrett
2- Rusty Wallace
6- Mark Martin

Failed to qualify: Brian Rose (No. 51), Carl Long (No. 59), Morgan Shepherd (No. 89), Ryan McGlynn (No. 80), Kirk Shelmerdine (No. 27)

Kurt Busch became the 1st driver since Rusty Wallace in 1986 to score his first 2 career wins on short tracks, and with an ironic twist, Rusty also got his first 2 career wins at Bristol and Martinsville.
Last career Top 5 for Ward Burton.

NAPA 500 

The NAPA 500 was held at Atlanta Motor Speedway on October 27. Qualifying was rained out, so points leader Tony Stewart started on the pole. The race was shortened to 248 laps due to rain.

Top ten results

97- Kurt Busch
25- Joe Nemechek
88- Dale Jarrett
20- Tony Stewart
8- Dale Earnhardt Jr.
24- Jeff Gordon
40- Jamie McMurray
6- Mark Martin
17- Matt Kenseth
12- Ryan Newman

Failed to qualify: Geoff Bodine (No. 09), Frank Kimmel (No. 66), Scott Wimmer (No. 27), Greg Biffle (No. 16), Buckshot Jones (No. 00), Jack Sprague (No. 60), Kerry Earnhardt (No. 83), Ron Hornaday Jr. (No. 54)

First time, and as of 2022, the only time in Kurt Busch's career that he would win back-to-back races. He became the 3rd and final driver of 2002 to win back-to-back races, joining Bill Elliott and Jeff Gordon.

Pop Secret Microwave Popcorn 400 

The Pop Secret Microwave Popcorn 400 was held at North Carolina Speedway on November 3. Ryan Newman won the pole.

Top ten results

10- Johnny Benson*
6- Mark Martin
97- Kurt Busch
99- Jeff Burton
24- Jeff Gordon
4- Mike Skinner
18- Bobby Labonte
17- Matt Kenseth
32- Ricky Craven
30- Jeff Green

Failed to qualify: Tony Raines (No. 74), Tim Sauter (No. 71), Carl Long (No. 59), Ron Hornaday Jr. (No. 54), Hideo Fukuyama (No. 66)

This would be Johnny Benson's only Winston Cup Series win.
Mark Martin failed post-race inspection after an illegal left front spring was discovered. Martin was penalized 25 driver points, and Jack Roush was penalized 25 owner points.

Checker Auto Parts 500 

The Checker Auto Parts 500 was held at Phoenix International Raceway on November 10. Ryan Newman won the pole.

Top ten results

17- Matt Kenseth
2- Rusty Wallace
24- Jeff Gordon
6- Mark Martin
8- Dale Earnhardt Jr.
97- Kurt Busch
77- Dave Blaney
20- Tony Stewart
88- Dale Jarrett
21- Elliott Sadler

Failed to qualify: Ted Musgrave (No. 07), Jack Sprague (No. 60), Brett Bodine (No. 11), Jerry Robertson (No. 51), Morgan Shepherd (No. 89), Jeff Jefferson (No. 37), Lance Hooper (No. 47), Mike Harmon (No. 93)
Tony Stewart finished 8th and Mark Martin finished 4th. Stewart had to finish 22nd or better to clinch his first championship the following week at Homestead if Mark Martin led the most laps and won the race. 
Mark Martin's appeal to regain the 25 points back from his penalty at Rockingham due to the left front spring infraction was denied during qualifying for the following race at Homestead, the season finale. Stewart would officially start the race at Homestead with an 89 point lead over Martin. If the penalty was withdrawn, it would have been a 64 point margin.

Ford 400 
The Ford 400 was held at Homestead-Miami Speedway on November 17. Kurt Busch won the pole.

Top ten results

97- Kurt Busch
25- Joe Nemechek
99- Jeff Burton
6- Mark Martin
24- Jeff Gordon
12- Ryan Newman
9- Bill Elliott
48- Jimmie Johnson
21- Elliott Sadler
55- Bobby Hamilton

Failed to qualify: David Green (No. 54), Brett Bodine (No. 11), Hermie Sadler (No. 02), Tony Raines (No. 74), Boris Said (No. 67), Carl Long (No. 59), Geoff Bodine (No. 09), Mike Harmon (No. 93)

Tony Stewart clinches the 2002 NASCAR Winston Cup Championship after finishing in 18th place, the lowest for a driver to clinch the championship in the season finale since 1995 when Jeff Gordon finished 32nd.
Tony Stewart would be the last driver to win the championship in the season finale before the Playoffs Era.
2002 would be the last time in NASCAR history that a driver would win the title with less than 5,000 points to his total. 2002 would also be the only the season in the 36 race era (2001-Present) that a driver won the title with less than 5,000 points.
As of 2021, Tony Stewart is the only driver in NASCAR history to win the championship after finishing dead last in the 1st race of the season (43rd in the Daytona 500).
Although Tony Stewart finished 18th, Mark Martin put up a strong battle for the championship by finishing in 4th place. Unfortunately, with Martin's 4th place run and Stewart's 18th place run, Martin would gain 51 points on Stewart's 89 point lead. He would officially finish 2nd in points for the 4th time in his career, and with that, he would break out of a tie with James Hylton for the most runner-up finishes for a driver to never win a championship. He lost to Stewart by 38 points. His appeal to regain the 25 points back from his penalty at Rockingham due to the left front spring infraction was denied during Friday's qualifying session for this race. Even if he did regain those 25 points back from Rockingham, it still wouldn't have been enough for him to win the title. He would have lost by just 13 points. As of 2021, Mark Martin is considered the greatest of all time to never win a NASCAR Cup Series championship.
First time, and as of 2020, the only time in his career, that Kurt Busch would win from the pole.
Kurt Busch became the 2nd driver in NASCAR history to win the highest number of races in his first ever winning season with 4. Billy Wade would accomplish it first in 1964, when he became the only driver in NASCAR history to win his first set of career wins back-to-back when he won 4 in a row. Carl Edwards would join Wade and Busch 3 years later in 2005.
After 16 straight seasons with at least one victory from 1986 to 2001, Rusty Wallace failed to keep his winning streak alive in 2002. His 16-season winning streak of at least one race came to a total of 54 wins. His best finish in the 2002 season was 2nd place 4 times (Pepsi 400, Brickyard 400, Sharpie 500, and Checker Auto Parts 500). 16 straight seasons with at least 1 win was a NASCAR Modern Era record, a record that was started by Ricky Rudd in 1998. Wallace joined Rudd in 2001, and future champion Jimmie Johnson joined in a 3-way tie in 2017. In 2021, another future champion, Kyle Busch, became the Modern Era record holder after winning in Kansas, marking his 17th consecutive year of winning at least 1 race. Not only is he the Modern Era Record leader with 17 straight seasons, Busch is currently tied for 2nd All-Time with David Pearson (1964-1980). 18 straight seasons is the All-Time Record, which is held by Richard Petty. Petty went on to win 185 races from 1960 to 1977.
10th consecutive Top 10 points finish for Rusty Wallace.
Last career Top 10 for Bobby Hamilton.
Last career Top 10 points finishes for Dale Jarrett and Ricky Rudd.
First career Top 5 points finish for Jimmie Johnson.
First career Top 10 points finish for Ryan Newman.
Kyle Petty competed in every race in 2002. This would be the first time he has done so since 1998. He would finish the season 22nd in points.

Full Drivers' Championship

(key) Bold – Pole position awarded by time. Italics – Pole position set by owner's points. * – Most laps led.

Rookie of the Year
Because he had more wins, a teammate/mentor in Jeff Gordon, and the higher position in points, Jimmie Johnson was the favorite to win Rookie of the Year. But in the end, his rival Ryan Newman was named the victor. Newman's one win seemed mild to Johnson's record-tying three victories and even leading the championship standings at one point, but Newman broke the record for pole positions. The rookie points system is separate from the championship system, and only a driver's 15 best finishes counted towards the award. Newman's 15 best finishes were better than Johnson's, despite Johnson having the better run in championship points. Shawna Robinson and Carl Long, the only other racers who declared for the award, did not run enough races to remain eligible.

See also
2002 NASCAR Busch Series
2002 NASCAR Craftsman Truck Series

References

 
NASCAR Cup Series seasons